Mailly is a picturesque commune in the Saône-et-Loire department in the region of Bourgogne-Franche-Comté in eastern France.Mailly is located in the Brionnais's south. Separated by Caille, the town is spread over three hills,  Bourg, Chavannes and Corbey,

See also
Communes of the Saône-et-Loire department

References

Communes of Saône-et-Loire